Chidipani is a village in Palpa District in the Lumbini Zone of southern Nepal. At the time of the 1991 Nepal census it had a population of 4903 people living in 891 individual households.

Chidipani is located 21 kilometers east of Tansen, the district seat and is 5 km away from Arya Bhanjyang.

Mul Dhoka and Durbar were heavily destroyed by Maoists during their revolt.

References

External links
Chidipani
Arya Bhanjyang

Populated places in Palpa District